The third Blair ministry lasted from May 2005 to June 2007. The election on 5 May 2005 saw Labour win a historic third successive term in power, though their majority now stood at 66 seats – compared to 167 four years earlier – and they failed to gain any new seats. Blair had already declared that the new term in parliament would be his last.

The Afghanistan and Iraq wars continued during his last ministry, and the 7/7 bombings also took place, Blair's government responded by introducing a range of anti-terror legislation. Blair announced in 2006 that he would resign as prime minister and Labour leader within a year. He resigned on 27 June 2007 and was succeeded by Gordon Brown, who had been his chancellor of the Exchequer since 1997.

Cabinet

Changes 

 November 2005 – David Blunkett resigns his post as Secretary of State for Work and Pensions. He is replaced by John Hutton, leaving the post of Chancellor of the Duchy of Lancaster vacant for six months.
 May 2006 – Following a poor showing in the local council elections, Blair reshuffles his cabinet.  Charles Clarke, Geoff Hoon and Ian McCartney leave the Cabinet. Jack Straw becomes Leader of the House of Commons and Lord Keeper of the Privy Seal. Margaret Beckett is promoted to Foreign Secretary, John Reid to Home Secretary, David Miliband to Secretary of State for the Environment, Food and Rural Affairs and Des Browne to Secretary of State for Defence. Ruth Kelly takes a new post of Secretary of State for Communities and Local Government, which replaces the post held by David Miliband and takes a number of responsibilities previously held by the Office of the Deputy Prime Minister; Kelly will also serve as Minister for Women and Equality. Alan Johnson becomes Secretary of State for Education and Skills. Alistair Darling becomes Secretary of State for Trade and Industry. Hilary Armstrong becomes Chancellor of the Duchy of Lancaster, Minister for the Cabinet Office and Minister for Social Exclusion. Douglas Alexander enters the Cabinet as Secretary of State for Transport and Secretary of State for Scotland. Hazel Blears enters the Cabinet as Minister Without Portfolio and Party Chair, Stephen Timms as Chief Secretary to the Treasury and Jacqui Smith as Parliamentary Secretary to the Treasury and Chief Whip.
 May 2007 – The Home Office loses responsibility for criminal justice, prisons & probation and legal affairs which merges into the Department for Constitutional Affairs with Falconer becoming Secretary of State for Justice.
 June 2007 – On 27 June, Tony Blair officially tenders his resignation as Prime Minister to The Queen, with Deputy Prime Minister and First Secretary of State, John Prescott leaving office at the same time.

List of ministers

Prime Minister, the Cabinet Office and non-Departmental ministers

Departments of state

Law officers

Parliament

Whips

References

General

External links

British ministries
Government
2000s in the United Kingdom
2005 establishments in the United Kingdom
2007 disestablishments in the United Kingdom
Third ministry
Ministries of Elizabeth II
New Labour
Cabinets established in 2005
Cabinets disestablished in 2007